My Life (stylized as MY LIFE愛) is the second Korean-language extended play by South Korean singer Rain. It was released on December 1, 2017, by RAIN Company and distributed by Genie Music.  It is his EP in 7 years, since Back to the Basic in 2010, and his first musical release since the single "The Best Present" in January 2017.

Like most of his post-JYP releases, Rain was involved in every aspect of the album's production with the assistance of Brand New Music producer Tae Wan (responsible for Rain’s hit track “Rainism”, fellow The Unit mentor Jo Hyun Ah and rapper Gill.

The album contains a total of ten tracks, including the lead single "Gang" and pre-release track "Goodbye" with Jo Hyun Ah.

Background
On September 7, 2015, Rain announced through his Facebook page that he and the CEO came to a mutual decision to not renew his contract with Cube Entertainment.  After parting ways with Cube, on October 11, 2015, he announced through his official website that he had created his own one-man agency with the aid of his longtime manager and other entertainment figures. After the formation of his company, he embarked on a world tour entitled The Squall trekking across Southeast Asia.

Since 2016, Rain and his management company. RAIN Company, have tease the concept of his musical comeback. Between his busy touring and filming schedules, his comeback has been delayed several times. In December 2016, it was announced that he would return with the release of the Psy-produced single "The Best Present" on January 15, 2017. The track peaked at number 5 on the Gaon Chart. With the single's release, Rain appeared on variety shows Knowing Bros. and Please Take Care of My Refrigerator.

After months of speculation, Rain was confirmed to be a mentor and host of the idol survival program The Unit alongside Shinee's Taemin, soloist HyunA, rapper San E, singer and host Hwang Chi-yeul and Urban Zakapa vocalist Jo Hyun Ah.

Rain was in charge of all aspects of the album including lyrics, composition, arrangement, and production, while working with Brand New Music producer Tae Wan (responsible for Rain's track "Rainism"), Urban Zakapa's Jo Hyun Ah and former Leessang member Gil.

Release
On November 7, it was announced that Rain would come back with a new mini album My Life on December 1. Following the announcement of the album, links on various digital music portals as well as South Korean and international music retails began open for album pre-orders.

My Life was released physically and digitally on December 1, 2017.

Singles

"Goodbye"
Rain revealed a  teaser image for "Goodbye" through his Instagram on November 17. RAIN Company stated that “‘Goodbye’ is Rain’s pre-release track that is perfect for the winter. Rain is taking on a new challenge as he steps away from his usual image as a dancer and performer to try his hand at a traditional ballad.” The song mentioned to be a duet between him and a female artist. Later on, through a video teaser on his official website, the unknown female artist was revealed to be fellow The Unit mentor and Urban Zakapa vocalist Jo Hyun Ah. It was followed by the official video the following day. The video features both Rain and Hyun Ah in the studio writing and producing the song while performing in the studio booth. The duet partners did a special performance of the song for Dingo Music.

"Gang"

On November 27, RAIN Company revealed a teaser image for the title track. Later on, Rain released images for the single along with a video teaser. Where "Goodbye" was more of a traditional duet ballad, "Gang" is described " a powerful dance track that will give Rain another opportunity to showcase his stellar dancing skills and stage presence". Hours later, a full video teaser was revealed with the full video being released the same day as the mini album. In the video, Rain is showcased switching between intense and smooth choreography as he and his dancers perform in an abandon warehouse, a vibrant, lit fairground, a colorful bowling alley and a sun-drenched abandoned shipyard. With the album's release, Rain released a series of special clips.

Promotion
On November 24, Rain kicked off promotion for the album by doing a V-Live chat and a special interview on The Cultwo Show on SBS Power FM.

Following the comeback announcement, RAIN Company revealed that the entertainer would have his own KBS comeback special titled 2017 RAIN IS BACK, which aired December 3 on KBS 2 at 10:40pm KST. It was filmed on November 21 at the KBS Hall in Yeoido, Seoul in front of Rain's fans. The comeback special featured a special collaboration stage between The Unit contestants and Rain himself.

Rain began promoting his comeback album on various music programs, starting on the December 1, 2014, broadcast of KBS 2's Music Bank.

On release day, Rain held a press conference talking about his fifteenth anniversary, the album production, family life and his role on The Unit.

Following his comeback, Rain made a series of variety show promotional activities. He filmed with the cast and crew of JTBC's Carefree Travelers in Taiwan on October29 to be aired on November 28 and December 2. He was featured in an episode of MBC's I Live Alone with actor and friend Lee Si-eon. He filmed his first appearance on MBC's Weekly Idol on November 24 before airing on December 6.

Track listing

Credits and personnel
Jung Ji Hoon - vocals, songwriter, arrangement, music producer, composer
Kim Tae Wan - songwriter, arrangement, music producer, composer
takey -  composer
Jo Hyun Ah - featured artist, songwriter, arrangement, composer
MAGIC MANSION - songwriter, composer
LTAK - songwriter

Release history

References 

Rain (entertainer) albums
2017 albums